Grūda is a lake located near Ašašninkai village between Lithuania and Belarus, 30 kilometers south-east of Druskininkai. The lake is divided between the two countries. The lake is a popular spot for fishing. The average depth is around 2.5 meters while the maximum depth is more than 5 meters.

References

Gruda
Gruda
Belarus–Lithuania border